Zalim Borisovich Shebzukhov (6 October 1986 – 17 August 2016) was an Islamist from Kabardino-Balkaria, Russia, and a leader of the Caucasus Emirate militant group.

Biography
Zalim was imprisoned for two years, after his arrest on 7 December 2007. On 24 June 2009 he was released. Shortly after, Zalim joined the Caucasus Emirate. On 16 April 2015 the National Anti-Terrorist Committee announced his death during a special operation in Nalchik, but soon after the committee informed the media that they were mistaken and it was another militant (Zaur Prokopchuk) that was killed during that action. On 10 November 2015 Russian special forces announced the death of top federal fugitive Robert Zankishiev, who led the militants of Kabardino-Balkaria. On 28 December 2015 Zalim replaced Robert as head of Kabardino-Balkaria's terrorist organization and soon his organization became part of Caucasus Emirate.

Death
For a time, his fate (and his location) were unknown until Saint Petersburg Police received information that Zalim might be hiding in the city. He was killed by Russian security forces, along with Astemir Sheriev and Vyacheslav Nyrov, during a raid on Zalim's apartment in Saint-Petersburg, in August 2016.

References

External links 
 Is Kabardino-Balkaria The Caucasus Emirate’s Last Bastion?

2016 deaths
Caucasus Emirate members
Emirs of the Caucasian Emirate
People shot dead by law enforcement officers in Russia
1986 births
Leaders of Islamic terror groups
People from Kabardino-Balkaria